Bač (Бач), pronounced in English as Bach, was a historical Slavic personal name whose existence was documented in the Middle Ages. It is not certain whether the language of this name is Slavic, Paleo-Balkanic or Romanian.

History

The name was recorded in Serbia in the 14th century in the medieval Serbian documents known as the second and third Dečanska hrisovulja. Same documents also recorded the surname Bačević ("the son of Bač"), which indicate that the name was used in the previous time period as well. The wide usage of this personal name among South Slavs in the past is indicated by large number of place names beginning with letters bač- scattered throughout the former Yugoslavia and Bulgaria.

Etymology

One theory about language of the name claim that name Bač is of Slavic language, which could be confirmed by the fact that a similar name, Bača, was recorded among old Russians. In the territory of former Yugoslavia, several similar personal names are recorded among South Slavs too - Bača, Bačeta, Bačić, Bačko, Bačun, etc.

By the opinion of Milica Grković, the name Bač is of Paleo-Balkanic language. Another theory implies possible Romanian language of the name. In the Romanian language, baci (pronounced the same way as Bač) means "tenant, mountaineer or chieftain of the shepherd habitation in the mountain". The name could be spread into other languages by the Vlach shepherds.

Place names

There are several places named Bač:
In Serbia: Bač, a town and municipality in South Bačka District, Vojvodina province.
In North Macedonia: Bač, a village and municipality in the southern part of the country.
In Slovenia: two places named Bač in Benedikt municipality (as well as one named Bač pri Materiji) and one place named Bač in south-western part of the country.
In Montenegro: place named Bač in north-eastern part of the country.
In Albania: two places named Bač (Albanian variant Baç), one in the district of Qarku i Lezhes and another in the district of Qarku i Vlores.

There is also a large number of place names beginning with letters "bač-" scattered all over the former Yugoslavia, including places with names Bača, Bačevac, Bačevci, Bačevica, Bačevići, Bačica, Bačići, Bačija, Bačije, Bačina, Bačinci, Bačinska jezera, Bačište, Bačkovac, Bačkovica, Bačva, Bačvice, etc. There is also a certain number of place names beginning with letters "bač-" in other Slavic and non-Slavic countries as well.

In Bulgaria, there is a well-known tourist destination - the Orthodox monastery Bachkovo.

Surnames

There are also many South Slavic surnames beginning with letters "bač-", such are: Bača, Bačanac, Bačani, Bačanin, Bačanović, Bačar, Bačarević, Baček, Bačevac, Bačević, Bačikin, Bačinić, Bačinski, Bačić, Bačkalov, Bačko, Bačkonja, Bačković, Bačkulja, Bačlija, Bačlić, Bačujkov, Bačulov, Bačvanin, Bačvanović, Bačvanski, Bačvarević, etc.

See also

Bács - a similar Hungarian name

Notes

Slavic culture